Mawgan-in-Meneage is a civil parish in Cornwall, United Kingdom. It is situated in the Meneage district of The Lizard peninsula south of Helston in the former administrative district of Kerrier. The parish population at the 2011 census was 1437.

Mawgan-in-Meneage lies within the Cornwall Area of Outstanding Natural Beauty (AONB). Almost a third of Cornwall has AONB designation.

Antiquities
Evidence of early medieval habitation at Mawgan is in the form of an inscribed pillar stone, located at the meeting of three roads at the centre of the village; it bears an inscription that is no longer readable, but based on an old drawing and a photograph taken in 1936 it could have been a memorial stone to either 'Cnegumus son of Genaius' or 'Genaius son of Cnegumus'. The date of this inscription is not certain beyond having been carved before the twelfth century.

History
The name of the manor was given as "scanctus [sic] mawgan" after the dedication of the church, in the Domesday Book.

The parish church is dedicated to St Mauganus, a Welshman, and he is also honoured at Mawgan in Pydar and in Wales and Brittany. The church is a Grade I Listed building and its surviving fabric dates from the 13th century onwards. Of the earliest date is the font and the south wall. The granite west tower is 15th century perpendicular gothic, and the waggon roof also dates from that century. 

The church was described in the Cornishman newspaper as "an old and dilapidated structure" following a storm, when the porch and the south aisle lost much of their roofing on 29 April 1882. Subsequently the church was restored, with unusual sensitivity for the period, by E H Sedding in 1894.

Other than the font, the church also contains a 14th century sepulchre to the Carminow Family and the mausoleum of Richard Vyvyan 1st Baronet (d.1665).

Trelowarren

At Trelowarren is the estate of the Vyvyan family, who have owned it since 1427. The Halliggye Fogou at Trelowarren is the largest in Cornwall. Trelowarren House has a complex building history: the original house is mid-15th century and there are later parts dated 1662, 1698 and ca. 1750 (further additions were made during the 19th century).

Notes

Further reading

Vyvyan, C. C. The Old Place. London, 1952

External links

Civil parishes in Cornwall
Manors in Cornwall
Meneage
Villages in Cornwall